Vladimíra Havelková (born June 29, 1966 in Znojmo) is a Czechoslovak sprint canoer who competed in the early 1990s. She was eliminated in the semifinals of the K-4 500 m event at the 1992 Summer Olympics in Barcelona.

References
 Sports-Reference.com profile

1966 births
Canoeists at the 1992 Summer Olympics
Czechoslovak female canoeists
Czech female canoeists
Living people
Olympic canoeists of Czechoslovakia
People from Znojmo
Sportspeople from the South Moravian Region